Labrostochelys is an extinct genus of bothremydid pleurodiran turtle that was discovered in the Ouled Abdoun Basin, Morocco. The genus consists solely of type species L. galkini.

Discovery 
Labrostochelys was discovered in the Ouled Abdoun Basin of Morocco, primarily known for its Maastrichtian and Paleocene fossils. It is known from a nearly complete skull.

References 

Prehistoric turtle genera
Paleocene turtles
Fossils of Morocco 
Bothremydidae 
Paleocene life
Cretaceous Africa
Fossil taxa described in 2006
Monotypic turtle genera